The 1962 Louisville Cardinals football team was an American football team that represented the University of Louisville as an independent during the 1962 NCAA University Division football season. In their 17th season under head coach Frank Camp, the Cardinals compiled a 6–4 record and outscored opponents by a total of 174 to 173.

The team's statistical leaders included John Giles with 1,222 passing yards, Lee Calland with 650 rushing yards and 48 points scored, and Don Hockensmith with 408 receiving yards.

Schedule

References

Louisville
Louisville Cardinals football seasons
Louisville Cardinals football